Frédéric Dohou (born 1961) is a political figure from Benin.

He holds a PhD in Development Economics (1986) and he held several ministerial posts under the chairmanship of Mathieu Kérékou.

Founder of the University of Science and Technology of Benin, it is currently the chairman of the board of the Network of Universities of Science and Technology of the Countries of Africa south of the Sahara (RUSTA).

Political career

Governmental functions :
Special Advisor to the President Mathieu Kérékou (2001-2003)
Minister of Culture, Handicrafts and Tourism (2003-2005)
Minister of Communication and Promotion of New Technologies (2005-2006)
Government Spokesman (2005-2006)
Minister of Foreign Affairs and African Integration, ad interim (2006)

References

1961 births
Living people
Foreign ministers of Benin
Heads of universities in Benin
People from Cotonou